Baixo Vouga is a former Portuguese subregion integrated in the Centro Region. It was abolished at the January 2015 NUTS 3 revision. It was centered on the city of Aveiro. Other major cities included Águeda, Ílhavo and Ovar. The subregion covered an area of 1,807 km2 and had a population of 394,393 inhabitants (2005) for an overall density of 218 inhabitants/km2. It was crossed from east to west by the Vouga River.

Economy
Baixo Vouga is a subregion of heavy industry; its exports include paper, ceramics, chemicals, automobiles, and food. Tourism, education (including the University of Aveiro) and health services are also very developed.

Municipalities
The municipalities (Concelhos) of Baixo Vouga ("Lower Vouga" river valley) are:
Águeda
Albergaria-a-Velha
Anadia
Aveiro
Estarreja
Ílhavo 
Murtosa
Oliveira do Bairro
Ovar
Sever do Vouga
Vagos

Note: Mealhada used to be part of Baixo Vouga. It is now part of Baixo Mondego / Regiao de Coimbra.

Transport
Several motorways, tollways (auto-estradas)[A 1;A 25].
Main train stations: Aveiro (main hub)
Ovar, Esmoriz, Pampilhosa, Mealhada, Estarreja, O.do Bairro, Mogofores.
Other stations: Avanca, Oia, Paraimo/Sangalhos, Quintas, Luso.
Principal airfield: Aveiro/Sao Jacinto [PVA].
Chief harbor: Porto de Aveiro {Ilhavo/Aveiro}.

References

Former NUTS 3 statistical regions of Portugal